Historic District H, also known as the Missouri Training School for Boys District, is a national historic district located at Boonville, Cooper County, Missouri.  It encompasses 15 contributing buildings associated with the Missouri Training School for Boys, a state juvenile detention facility.  The district includes representative examples of Late Victorian style architecture.  Notable buildings include the Administration Building (1890), Superintendent's Residence (1910-1917), Dining Hall (1890s), Commissary (1910-1917), and Barn (1890s, 1931).

It was listed on the National Register of Historic Places in 1983.

References

Historic districts on the National Register of Historic Places in Missouri
School buildings on the National Register of Historic Places in Missouri
Victorian architecture in Missouri
National Register of Historic Places in Cooper County, Missouri
Juvenile detention centers in the United States
Prisons on the National Register of Historic Places
Boonville, Missouri